Lucirio Garrido is a Venezuelan former track and field athlete who competed in the 3000 metres steeplechase and the 5000 metres. He is the first of a dynasty of Venezuelan international athletes, including his son, Lucirio Garrido Jr. and his grandson Lucirio Antonio Garrido.

Competing from 1970 to the early 1980s, he was a three-time medallist at both the South American Championships in Athletics and the Central American and Caribbean Games, and a six-time medallist at the Central American and Caribbean Championships in Athletics. He won medals at three editions of the Bolivarian Games, finishing with a steeplechase gold at the 1981 Games.

International competitions

References

Living people
Year of birth missing (living people)
Venezuelan male long-distance runners
Venezuelan male steeplechase runners
Central American and Caribbean Games silver medalists for Venezuela
Central American and Caribbean Games bronze medalists for Venezuela
Athletes (track and field) at the 1971 Pan American Games
Competitors at the 1974 Central American and Caribbean Games
Competitors at the 1982 Central American and Caribbean Games
Central American and Caribbean Games medalists in athletics
Pan American Games competitors for Venezuela